Kid in a Candy Store is a reality television series that originally premiered on Food Network on July 12, 2010. The show follows Adam Gertler on his "hunt to find the craziest desserts in the world of candy confections".

References

External links

Kid in a Candy Store on TV.com

Food Network original programming
2010s American reality television series
2010 American television series debuts
2011 American television series endings